"Afto Ton Kero" is a song recorded by Greek Cypriot singer Ivi Adamou. It was released on 10 March 2017. The song is written and produced by Michalis Kouinelis.

Background and release 
The song was first teased when Adamou posted a photo from the shooting of its music video. During an interview on the ANT1 talk show The 2Night Show, a short clip from the song was shown. The teaser was officially released on 6 March 2017 along with the title of the song, "Afto Ton Kero".

Music video 
The music video for the song was shot in January 2017; Adamou posted a photo from the shooting of the music video on 27 January 2017. It was released on the same day the song was released digitally, on 10 March 2017. The video was directed by Dimitris Sylvestros, who also directed the music videos for Adamou's two previous singles, "Tipota De Mas Stamata" and "Akou Sopa".

Credits and personnel 
 Ivi Adamou – lead vocals
 Michalis Kouinelis – writer, recording, orchestration, programming, producer
 Vaggelis Georgantzis – mixing, mastering, keyboard, orchestration, programming
 Vaggelis Papanastasiou – clarinet 
 Nikos Karayiannis – acoustic and electric guitar
 Theodoros Bozentomov – bass
 Rejo Jo – drums

Release history

References 



2017 singles
2016 songs
Ivi Adamou songs
Minos EMI singles
Songs written by Michalis Kouinelis